Henry Barton (died 1435) was an English public official, MP for London and Lord Mayor of London.

Henry Barton may also refer to:
 Henry Barton (academic) (died 1790), British clergyman and academic, Warden of Merton College, Oxford
 Henry Baldwin Barton (1869–1952), British army officer, Mayor of the Metropolitan Borough of Finsbury

See also
 Harry Barton (disambiguation)